Arvid Costmar (born 7 July 2001) is a Swedish professional ice hockey centre currently playing for Linköping HC of the Swedish Hockey League (SHL).

Playing career
Costmar was drafted 215th overall by the Vancouver Canucks in the 2019 NHL Entry Draft. Costmar made his Swedish Hockey League debut with Linköping HC during the 2018–19 SHL season, appearing in 4 regular season games.

Career statistics

Regular season and playoffs

International

References

External links

2001 births
Living people
Linköping HC players
Mora IK players
People from Motala Municipality
Swedish ice hockey centres
Vancouver Canucks draft picks
Sportspeople from Östergötland County